The Greek Orthodox Archdiocese of Australia is the Australian archdiocese of the Greek Orthodox Church, part of the wider communion of Eastern Orthodox Christianity. The archdiocese is a jurisdiction of the Ecumenical Patriarchate of Constantinople. As of 2015, there were over 120 parishes and eight monasteries in the four diocesan districts of the archdiocese in Australia.

Archbishop of Australia 
Archbishop Stylianos was the primate of the Greek Orthodox Church of Australia. He was appointed to the position in 1975. The archbishop was a theologian of international standing. He was the co-chairman of the official dialogue between the Roman Catholic and Orthodox churches. He won an award for poetry and wrote 16 collections. He died in 2019. 

On 9 May 2019, his successor, Bishop Makarios, was elected by the Holy Synod of the Ecumenical Patriarchate as Archbishop of Australia. Archbishop Makarios was enthroned in front of thousands of faithful on 29 June 2019 at the Cathedral of the Annunciation of the Theotokos.

History
The first churches founded by Greek Orthodox in Australia were Holy Trinity in Surry Hills, Sydney (1898), and Annunciation of the Theotokos in East Melbourne (1900). The first priest to serve the religious needs of the Greek Orthodox population in Sydney and Melbourne was Archimandrite Dorotheos Bakaliaros. In March 1924, the "Metropolis of Australia and New Zealand" was established under the Ecumenical Patriarchate to cover the expanding Greek population, which by 1927 numbered over 10,000 and had established churches in Sydney, Melbourne, Brisbane, Perth and Port Pirie in South Australia. The first metropolitan of the new province of the Ecumenical Patriarchate was Christoforos Knitis of Serres. In 1929, Metropolitan Christoforos returned to his homeland, Samos. He died on 7 August 1959.

In 1931, Timotheos Evangelinidis was elected as the second Metropolitan of Australia and New Zealand. He arrived in Australia on 28 January 1932 and presided over the church in Australia and New Zealand until 1947 when he was elected Metropolitan of Rhodes. On 22 April of that year, Theophylactos Papathanasopoulos was elected as the third metropolitan. On 2 August 1958, Metropolitan Theophylactos was killed in a car accident. In February 1959 the assistant bishop of the Archdiocese of America, Bishop Ezekiel Tsoukalas of Nazianzos, was elected Metropolitan of Australia. He arrived in Sydney on 27 April 1959.

On 1 September 1959, the Metropolis of Australia and New Zealand was elevated to an archdiocese and Metropolitan Ezekiel to an archbishop. Archbishop Ezekiel's episcopacy coincided with a period of great expansion in the numbers of Greek Orthodox in Australia through immigration, and many of the parishes that the church has today were formed under his guidance. In August 1974, the Holy and Sacred Synod of the Ecumenical Patriarchate elevated Archbishop Ezekiel to the titular see of Metropolitan of Pisidia. He died in Athens in July 1987. On 3 February 1975, the Holy Synod of the Ecumenical Patriarchate unanimously elected the Metropolitan of Miletoupolis, Stylianos Harkianakis, a lecturer at the University of Thessaloniki, as the new Archbishop of Australia. Archbishop Stylianos arrived in Sydney on 15 April 1975 and was officially enthroned on Lazarus Saturday, 26 April 1975.

Primates

 Metropolitan Christoforos of Australia and New Zealand (1924-1929)
 Metropolitan Timotheos of Australia and New Zealand (1931-1947)
 Metropolitan Theophylactos of Australia and New Zealand (1947-1958)
 Metropolitan Ezekiel  of Australia and New Zealand (1959), Archbishop Ezekiel of Australia and New Zealand (1959-1970), Archbishop Ezekiel of Australia (1970-1974) 
 Archbishop Stylianos of Australia (1975-2019)
 Archbishop Makarios of Australia (2019–present)

Current hierarchs

The following clergy are members of the archdiocese's current hierarchy.

Archdiocesan Districts and Heads

District of Sydney
 Bishop Panteleimon of Theoupoleos (1971-1972)
 Unknown (1973-1990)
 Bishop Seraphim of Apollonias (1991-2019)
 Bishop Aimilianos of Meloe (2019-2021)
Since November of 2021, the Archbishop of Australia has assumed responsibilities of the Archdiocesan district of Sydney

District of Melbourne
 Bishop Panteleimon of Theoupoleos (1972-1975)
 Unknown (1976-1979)
 Bishop Panteleimon of Theoupoleos (1979-1984)
 Bishop Ezekiel of Dervis (1984-2021)
 Bishop Joseph of Arianzos (2001-2003) (assistant)
 Bishop Iakovos of Miletoupolis (2011-2019) (assistant)
 Bishop Kyriakos of Sozopolis (2021-present)

District of Adelaide
 Bishop Panteleimon of Theoupoleos (1975-1979)
 Bishop Ezekiel of Dervis (1980-1984)
 Bishop Paul of Christianoupolis (1984-1989)
 Bishop Joseph of Arianzos (1990-2000)
 Bishop Seraphim of Christianoupolis (2001-2002)
 Bishop Nikandros of Dorylaion (2002-2019)
 Bishop Silouanos of Sinope (2020-present)

District of Perth
 Bishop Ezekiel of Dervis (1977-1980)
 Unknown (1981-2001)
 Bishop Nikandros of Dorylaion (2001-2002)
From June 2002 until January 2020, Perth and Western Australia was under the jurisdiction of the Adelaide Archdiocesan district
 Bishop Elpidios of Cyneae (2020-present)

District of Brisbane
 V. Rev. Fr Gregory Sakellariou (1961-2000)
 V. Rev. Fr Dimitri Tsakas (2000-2019)
 Bishop Iakovos of Miletoupolis (2019-2021)
 Bishop Aimilianos of Meloe (2021-present)

District of Northcote, Victoria
Until its formation in 2019, this region was a part of the Melbourne Archdiocesan district
 Bishop Evmenios of Kerasounta (head of this district as a priest 2019-2020, as a bishop 2021-present)

District of Canberra and Tasmania
Until its formation in 2020, the Canberra region was under the jurisdiction of the Sydney district and the Tasmanian region was a part of the Melbourne district
 Bishop Bartholomew of Charioupolis (head of this district as a priest 2020, as a bishop 2021-present)

St Andrew's Greek Orthodox Theological College
St Andrew's Greek Orthodox Theological College is an Eastern Orthodox Christian seminary located in Redfern, Sydney, New South Wales. The college was established in 1986 by Archbishop Stylianos, who had proposed the establishment of a theological college during the fourth clergy and laity congress in 1981. There was a need for a theological college that would be primarily dedicated to theological study in co-operation with other theological colleges. It would be hoped that a centre of theological reflection and ecumenical dialogue would be created, offering the Orthodox worldview and perspective with scriptural commentaries, the writings of the Greek Fathers, the Orthodox liturgy, iconography and spirituality.

Greek Orthodox monasteries in Australia
 Holy Monastery of St George (New South Wales)
 Holy Monastery of Panagia Pantanassa (New South Wales)
 Holy Monastery of the Holy Cross (New South Wales)
 Holy Monastery of Panagia Gorgoepikouos (Victoria)
 Holy Monastery of Axion Estin (Victoria)
 Holy Monastery of Panagia Kamariani (Victoria)
 Holy Monastery of St Nektarios (South Australia)
 Holy Monastery of St John (Western Australia)

See also

Archbishop of America
Greek Australian
Greek Orthodox Churches in NSW

References

Bibliography

External links
 Official website

Eastern Orthodoxy in Australia
Australia
Greek-Australian culture
Christian organizations established in 1924
Eastern Orthodox dioceses in Oceania